Historic Savannah Foundation (HSF) is a preservation organization founded in 1955 and based in Savannah, Georgia, United States.

In 1950, the four-story Wetter House on East Oglethorpe was demolished. This, combined with the razing of Savannah's popular City Market in Ellis Square, to be replaced by a parking garage, prompted a public outcry. The following year, a funeral home was set to purchase the Isaiah Davenport House in Columbia Square and tear it down for a parking lot. This sparked a movement to start a preservation process in the city.

Local journalist, artist and activist Anna Colquitt Hunter (1892–1985) formed a group with six of her friends to block the demolition of the house and formed the Historic Savannah Foundation. The group managed to raise the $22,500 needed to purchase the property themselves.

The office of the foundation is in the southwest tything of the Columbia Square, at the Abraham Sheftall House, 321 East York Street. It had formerly been at the Isaiah Davenport House at 324 East State Street.

The Foundation bestows its highest honor, the Davenport Award, on select individuals.

In 1977, the foundation published Historic Savannah: A Survey of Significant Buildings in the Historic and Victorian Districts of Savannah, Georgia.

Founders
Anna Colquitt Hunter (1892–1985)
Katherine "Kass" Judkins Clark (1897–1993)
Elinor Adler Dillard (1903–1992)
Lucy Barrow McIntire (1886–1967)
Dorothy Ripley Roebling (1904–1977)
Nola McEvoy Roos (1895–1980)
Jane Adair Wright (1901–1991)

Lee Adler, son of Elinor Adler Dillard,  served as the Foundation's president for six terms.

Plaques

References

External links
Historic Savannah Foundation official website
HSF's blog

1955 establishments in Georgia (U.S. state)
Organizations established in 1995
Historic preservation organizations in the United States
Organizations based in Savannah, Georgia
Columbia Square (Savannah) buildings